Felice Colombo (born 24 August 1937) is an Italian businessman, past chairman of A.C. Milan from 1977 to 1980.

His son Nicola Colombo is the former owner of Calcio Monza.

References

External links
Site of his business activity

1937 births
20th-century Italian businesspeople
A.C. Milan chairmen and investors
Italian football chairmen and investors
Living people
People from Brianza
People from the Province of Monza e Brianza